St Pauls Church, Glenamoy is the parish church of Glenamoy, in the Roman Catholic Diocese of Killala in Ireland. It is located within the village of Glenamoy on the R314 road to Belmullet. It is one of five churches for the Kilcommon-Erris parish.

History 
Before the present structure was completed, mass used to be said in the old school.

The church was built in the 1930s and serves the small rural community of Glenamoy and its surrounding areas in North Mayo.

In 2020, due to the prolonged exposure to harsh weather conditions, the fabric of the church deteriorated and the church is currently in the process of restoration.

It is registered with The National Inventory of Architectural Heritage for Ireland, no.31301201

See also 

 Glenamoy
 Belmullet
 County Mayo
 Roman Catholic Diocese of Killala

References

External links 

 http://kilcommonerrisparish.com/ parish website

Roman Catholic churches in County Mayo
Roman Catholic churches completed in 1936
20th-century Roman Catholic church buildings in Ireland
20th-century churches in the Republic of Ireland